Tertangala is the student magazine of the University of Wollongong.

Content
The magazine features student investigative and feature articles, news, artwork, opinion, film and music reviews, as well as interviews and editorials. Submissions from staff and students (including student association representatives) makes up the bulk of the magazines content, however submissions from other members of the community are also accepted.

From time to time, the Tertangala has been known to use themes as a way to source content and spark interest amongst the student population. However, themes are not at all restrictive and content is accepted even if it does not conform to the set theme.

History
Tertangala was first published in September 1962, when the school was still an external campus of the University of New South Wales, making it older than the University of Wollongong itself. Colloquially referred to as "The Tert" by students, the paper was formerly edited by the elected Media Coordinator of WUSA. The Media Coordinator was elected by a popular vote open to all WUSA members. 

Tertangala has a radical editorial tradition and many of its former editors have transitioned into active political and artistic life. Past editors and staff members have also gone on to write for other publications, such as The New York Times, The Guardian, Rolling Stone, The Australian and Vogue.

Throughout the years, Tertangala has won multiple awards, including a merit award for cover design and an investigative journalism award for a feature article about the re-opening of a copper smelter in Port Kembla. Tertangala was also named one of the top five student publications in the country.

Tertangala editors and contributors have also been regularly involved as presenters and organisers of the This is Not Art festival.

Tertangala was originally printed by the Illawarra Mercury.

All copies of Tertangala are archived by the University of Wollongong library, and many are available online.

Name
The name Tertangala is said to mean "smoke signals". The name originates from the time when the University of Wollongong was a campus of UNSW, and was chosen to correspond with then sister paper Thurunka, meaning 'message stick'. Some people suggest that the name was also chosen to parody the atmosphere of Wollongong's industrial city.

First edition
The first edition was a four-page newspaper put together for the Wollongong University College Students' Union and featured a number of satirical and journalistic articles. It also included advertisements for Lance's (a David Jones' store) Maloufs Men's Wear and Rural Bank (which opened on campus for "two hours every pay day").

Controversies
A constitutional provision in the Wollongong Undergraduate Students' Association constitution, designed to check the Media Coordinator's editorial power, provides the right of veto over the content of the paper by the President of WUSA. The right of editorial control versus the censorial privilege of the WUSA President has ofttimes been a source of controversy and tension on the University of Wollongong campus. In early 2004, then-Editor Anneliese Constable fought the then-President Michael Szafraniec for the right to publish reports critical of his administration of WUSA.

There has always been tension between Tertangala and its auspice the Wollongong Undergraduate Students' Association, usually around issues of right to free press and free speech when reporting on WUSA actions. Robert Bruce Keanan Brown (aka b2) (Editor 1988-1990) resigned in an open letter in Tertangala citing the "bureaucratisation" of the magazine as his main reason for leaving. He stated that:

"Tertangala is the property of the Students, NOT of the SRC... it cannot be made to serve the purposes of the political junketeers that infest the SRC."

Tertangala has also been accused of being depraved, pornographic, obscene and offensive by residents and local media on more than one occasion. The first was following a Commem Week edition of the publication called Daily Moron in 1974. Locals took issue with the magazine's liberal use of the word 'fuck'.

During 2009, the WUSA Queer Collective produced the Sexuality and Gender edition of Tertangala, without the consent of the Tertangala Collective. The edition received some student criticism relating to 'offensive' material. The Queer Collective confirmed that the publication was intentionally offensive, consistent with a long tradition of subversive student journalism at UOW.

Student journalism
Not all controversies have been created by Tertangala, and the magazine has a well-documented history of recording controversial decisions of University of Wollongong administration.  In 1999, the magazine reported the student uproar that followed a University decision to invite conservative commentator Piers Akerman to speak at a graduation ceremony.

Notable contributors
Dr. Karl Kruszelnicki used to write for Tertangala while studying at the University of Wollongong in the 1960s, and he ran for the position of editor in 1966 but was unsuccessful. He wrote to congratulate Tertangala on reaching 45 years in 2007.

Van Badham edited the magazine in 1997. Van is now an award-winning Australian playwright.

Quoted in Federal Parliament
Tertangala was quoted in federal parliament, in a speech made by former Australian Greens Member for Cunningham Michael Organ.

Funding
Throughout its history, Tertangala was funded by WUSA through membership fees collected from students. The introduction of voluntary student unionism significantly reduced the capacity of WUSA to continue to fund the publication. Following a long campaign in 2007 by the students involved, the University of Wollongong guaranteed $24,000 funding a year until 2010 in an effort to support the publication.

The magazine also uses advertising to supplement its funding base. The editor of the Tertangala reserves the right to determine who can and cannot advertise in the paper.

Editors

 1980 Jay Caselberg, James Hartley
 1993 Kathryn Goldie
 1995 Damien Cahill 
 1997 Van Badham
 1998 Stuart Hatter
 2000 James Beach
 2013 Andre Charadia, Chloe Higgins
 2016 Claudia Poposki, Jake Cupitt
 2017 Aisha Sini, Kurtis Hughes
 2018 Laura Thomas, Jarrett Wall
 2019 Co-ordinator: Alec Hall; Magazine Editor: Emily Jenkins; Digital Editor: Sarah Gore
 2020 Co-ordinator: Kal Slater; Magazine Editor: Caleb Connolly; Digital Editor: Grace Crivellaro
 2021 Co-ordinator: Eliza Lourenco; Magazine Editor: Lia Stamatopoulos
 2022 Co-ordinator: River McCrossen

See also
 University of Wollongong
 Wollongong Undergraduate Students' Association

External links
 Tertangala Website
 Back issues of the magazine (Internet Archive)
 At a stroke: how censorship renders student media pointless (Internet Archive)
 Tertangala back issues (1962-2004)

Student newspapers published in Australia
Publications established in 1962
University of Wollongong
1962 establishments in Australia